Sweet Life: Los Angeles is an American reality television series created by Issa Rae. It premiered on August 19, 2021, on HBO Max. In October 2021, it was renewed for a second season which premiered on August 4, 2022. In December 2022, the series was canceled after two seasons.

Background
Sweet Life was inspired by both the Frank Ocean song after which it is named, and the BET reality television show Baldwin Hills. The show follows a close group of African-American friends in their 20s, as they live their lives in South Los Angeles striving for "Black Excellence." The group is supportive of each other and their goals of chasing their dreams connect them.

Cast
Profession and age of cast members when the first season premiered:
Amanda Scott - PR professional, 25 
Briana Jones - Health care professional,  26
Cheryl Des Vignes - Fashion designer, 26
Jerrold Smith II - Marketing specialist, 25
Jordan Bentley (Season 1) - Streetwear designer, 24
 Myami Woods - (Season 2; guest Season 1) - Paralegal, Business Owner, Rebecca’s obsession 
 Candiss Hart - (Season 2; guest Season 1) - Financial Consultant with boyfriend Keilan Horton
 Keilan Horton - (Season 2; guest Season 1) - Financial Leader, antagonist 
P'Jae Compton - Artist manager, 27
Tylynn Burns - Event planner, 26
Rebecca Magett (Season 2; recurring season 1) - Bri's bestie and P'Jae's on-again-off-again love interest.
Rob Lee (Season 2; recurring season 1) - Amanda's boyfriend, who quit his full time job to pursue comedy.
Jaylenn Hart (Season 2; recurring season 1) - Tylynn's boyfriend who wants kids but not marriage.

Episodes

Season 1 (2021)

Season 2 (2022)

Awards
In 2022, the first season was nominated for an NAACP Image Award for Outstanding Reality Program, Reality Competition or Game Show, and a Guild of Music Supervisors Awards for Best Music Supervision in Reality Television.

References

External links

2020s American black television series
2020s American reality television series
2021 American television series debuts
2022 American television series endings
English-language television shows
HBO Max original programming
Hoorae Media